The Sudamérica Rugby Women's Sevens (formerly known as the CONSUR Women's Sevens), is the regional championship for women's international rugby sevens in South America. It has been contested since 2004. The tournament is held over two days, typically on a weekend. It is sanctioned and sponsored by Sudamérica Rugby.

The South America Women's Sevens Championship was first held in Venezuela in 2004. Since then, the regional 7s championships has periodically served as pre-qualifying competitions for the Rugby World Cup Sevens, the Pan American Games and the Olympic Games.

Tournament History

Results by year

Results by team

CONSUR Women's Sevens

2004 CONSUR Women's Sevens 
Venue/Date: Barquisimeto, Venezuela, 20–21 April, 2004

POOL STAGES 32-0 
 33-0 
 15-5 
 55-0 
 20-0 
 42-0 
 41-0 
 56-5 
 10-7 
 20-10 
 29-0 
 60-0 
CLASSIFICATION STAGES

Plate Semifinals

Cup Semifinals

2005 CONSUR Women's Sevens 
Venue/Date: 19–20 November 2005, São Paulo, Brazil (Source Brazil RFU) Summarised

Pool StagesPOOL One

Brazil 36-5 Argentina
Uruguay 19-5 Peru
Brazil 34-0 Uruguay
Argentina 48-0 Peru
Brazil 52-0 Peru
Argentina 17-0 Uruguay
POOL Two

Venezuela 10-7 Colombia
Chile 17-0 Paraguay
Venezuela 15-0 Chile
Colombia 29-0 Paraguay
Chile 5-25 Colombia
Venezuela 29-0 Paraguay
Classification Stages

5th-8th Semi Finals
Peru 0-36 Chile
Uruguay 19-0 Paraguay
1st-4th Semi Finals
Brazil 21-0 Colombia
Argentina 10-5 Venezuela
7th/8th Final
Peru 5-14 Paraguay
5th/6th Final
Chile 10-5 Uruguay
3rd/4th Final
Colombia 12-19 Venezuela
1st/2nd Final
Brazil 34-0 Argentina

2007 CONSUR Women's Sevens 
Date/Venue: 12–13 January 2007, Vina Del Mar, Chile (Source Brazil RFU) Summarised

Pool StagesPOOL One

Brazil 70-0 Peru
Venezuela 22-0 Chile
Brazil 24-0 Chile
Venezuela 62-0 Peru
Chile 45-0 Peru
Brazil 10-0 Venezuela
POOL Two

Argentina 32-0 Invitation
Colombia 33-7 Uruguay
Argentina 26-7 Uruguay
Colombia 24-5 Invitation
Uruguay 24-5 Invitation
Argentina 10-12 Colombia
Classification Stages

5th-8th Semi Finals
Chile 48-0 Invitation
Uruguay 36-0 Peru

1st-4th Semi Finals
Brazil 26-0 Argentina
Colombia 28-17 Venezuela

7th/8th Final
Peru 10-5 Invitation

5th/6th Final
Chile 12-5 Uruguay

3rd/4th Final
Argentina 7-17 Venezuela

1st/2nd Final
Brazil 27-0 Colombia

2009 CONSUR Women's Sevens 
Date/Venue: January 24–25, 2009. São Paulo, Brazil

Pool StagesPOOL A

Venezuela 50-0 Peru
Brazil 17-0 Colombia
Brazil 43-0 Peru
Venezuela 10-10 Colombia
Brazil 21-0 Venezuela
Colombia 15-7 Peru
POOL B

Uruguay 29-0 Paraguay
Argentina 46-0 Chile
Argentina 51-0 Paraguay
Uruguay 5-5 Chile
Uruguay 5-5 Argentina
Chile 20-5 Paraguay
Classification Stages

5th to 8th Place
Colombia 33-0 Paraguay
Peru 5-29 Chile
7th Place
Paraguay 0-15 Peru
5th Place
Colombia 32-0 Chile
Semi Finals
Brazil 20-5 Uruguay
Venezuela 7-24 Argentina
3rd Place
Uruguay 7-14 Venezuela
Final
Brazil 45-5 Argentina

2011 CONSUR Women's Sevens 
Date/Venue: February 5–6, 2011. Bento Gonçalves, Rio Grande do Sul, Brazil

Pool StagesPOOL A

Argentina 43 - 0 Venezuela
Brazil 44 - 0 Paraguay
Argentina 32 - 0 Paraguay
Brazil 36 - 0 Venezuela
Brazil 19 - 7 Argentina
Paraguay 0 - 19 Venezuela

5th to 8th Place
Columbia 31 - Paraguay 0
Peru 31 - Venezuela 0
7th Place
Venezuela 36 - 0 Paraguay
5th Place
Columbia 15 - Peru 0
POOL B

Uruguay 5 - 10 Chile
Colombia 12 - 5 Peru
Uruguay 26 - 0 Peru
Colombia 5 - 5 Chile
Chile 19 - 5 Peru
Columbia 5 - 24 Uruguay

Semi Finals
Brazil 5 - 0 Uruguay
Chile 0 - 19 Argentina

3rd Place
Chile 15 - 10 Uruguay
Final
Brazil 32 - 5 Argentina

South American Tournaments

2005 Rugby Valentin International Tournament 
This tournament took place on an unknown date although it appears sensible that it would have been prior to the South American tournament. Little is known apart from the finals

Final
Brazil A 31-7 Brazil B
Plate
Argentina A 27-0 Chile
Bronze
Argentina B 20-0 Uruguay A
Consolation
Charruas (Brazil) 19-0 Uruguay B

2009 South American Beach Games 
Venue/Date: 11–13 December 2009, Montevideo, Uruguay

Group GamesBrazil 5–2 Chile
Argentina 4–1 Paraguay
Uruguay 6–0 Venezuela
Argentina 3–4 Chile
Brazil 9–0 Venezuela
Uruguay 6–1 Paraguay
Brazil 8–0 Paraguay
Uruguay 2–3 Argentina
Chile 7–1 Venezuela
Uruguay 5–4 Chile
Venezuela 3–6 Paraguay
Brazil 5–2 Argentina
Paraguay 3–3 Chile
Venezuela 1–6 Argentina
Uruguay 3–2 Brazil
Classification Games

1st v 4th
Uruguay 3 - 2 Chile
2nd v 3rd
Brazil 5 - 3 Argentina
3rd place
Argentina 4 - 2 Chile
1st place
Brazil 3 - 1 Uruguay

2013 Valentín Martínez 
Date/Venue: November 9–10, 2013. Montevideo, Uruguay

POOL A

Brazil 52-0 Uruguay Negro
Argentina Rojo 17-7 Paraguay
Brazil 33-0 Paraguay
Argentina Rojo 17-7 Uruguay Negro
Uruguay Negro 26-7 Paraguay
Brazil 29-0 Argentina Rojo

5th/8th Semi Finals
Paraguay 27-0 Invitacion Circulo de Tennis 
Uruguay Negro 0-29 Chile
Uruguay 7-17 Argentina

7th Place
Invitacion Circulo de Tennis 15-12 Peru

5th Place
Chile 26-12 Paraguay
POOL B

Argentina Azul 41-0 Invitacion Circulo de Tennis 
Uruguay Celeste 33-5 Chile
Uruguay Celeste 43-0 Invitacion Circulo de Tennis 
Argentina Azul 24-5 Chile
Chile 40-0 Invitacion Circulo de Tennis 
Argentina Azul 22-0 Uruguay Celeste

Semi Finals
Brazil 43-0 Uruguay Celeste
Argentina Azul 36-0 Argentina Rojo

3rd Place
Uruguay Celeste 14-7 Argentina Rojo

Final
Brazil 26-17 Argentina Azul

2013 Bolivarian Games 

Date/Venue: November 17–19, 2013. Chiclayo, Peru

POOL

Day 1 (17 November)
Peru 33-10 Ecuador
Venezuela 17-12 Colombia
Peru 5-34 Colombia
Day 2 (18 November)
Peru 0-17 Venezuela
Colombia 52-0 Ecuador 
Venezuela 39-5 Ecuador

Day 3 (19 November)

3rd Place
Peru 40-7 Ecuador
Final
Colombia 12-7 Venezuela

2014 Valentín Martínez 
Date/Venue: November 8–9, 2014. Montevideo, Uruguay
Pool games (where known)
Brazil 48-0 Peru
Brazil 46-0 Venezuela
Venezuela 35-0 Peru
Paraguay 10-5 Chile
Argentina 31-5 Paraguay
Argentina 43-0 Chile
Colombia 34-14 Uruguay

Semi Finals
Brazil 45-0 Venezuela
Argentina 19-0 Colombia

7th Place
Chile bt Paraguay

5th Place
Chile 12-10 Uruguay (celeste)

3rd Place
Venezuela 17-10 Colombia

Final
Brazil 25-10 Argentina Azul

World Cup Qualifiers

2008
Venue & Date: Punta del Este, Uruguay, 18–19 January 2008.  This competition acted as a qualifier for the 2009 Rugby World Cup Sevens.

2012
Date/Venue: February 23–24, 2012. Estádio da Gávea, Rio de Janeiro, Brazil. This competition acted as a qualifier for the 2013 Rugby World Cup Sevens.

2017

Date: November 10-11, 2017. 
Venue: Carrasco Polo Club in Montevideo, Uruguay.

Women's Sevens World Series
Brazil was previously part of the World Rugby Women's Sevens Series for the 2013–14 and 2015–16 World Rugby Women's Sevens Series.

São Paulo

São Paulo

São Paulo

References

Rugby sevens in South America
Rugby sevens competitions in South America
South

pt:Campeonato Sul-Americano de Rugby#Feminino